West Beirut (()) is a 1998 Lebanese drama film, written and directed by Ziad Doueiri. The film was selected as the Lebanese entry for the Best Foreign Language Film at the 71st Academy Awards, but was not accepted as a nominee.

Plot
In April 1975, civil war breaks out; Beirut is partitioned along a line separating the Muslim-Christian mixed West Beirut from the  quasi-Christian East Beirut. After the line was created, Tarek is now considered to live in West Beirut (the mixed part and Tarek is Muslim himself) and is in high school, making Super 8 movies with his friend, Omar. At first the war is a lark: school has closed (and is situated in East Beirut no longer accessible to West Beirut residents), the violence is fascinating, getting from West to East is a game. His mother wants to leave the country; but his father refuses. Tarek spends time with May, an orphaned Christian girl living in his building. By accident, Tarek goes to an infamous brothel in the war-torn Zeytouni Quarter, meeting its legendary madam, Oum Walid. He then takes Omar and May there. Family tensions rise. Later on and as he comes of age, the war moves inexorably from adventure to a nationwide tragedy.

Cast
 Rami Doueiri as Tarek
 Mohamad Chamas as Omar
 Rola Al-Amin as May
 Carmen Lebbos as Hala, Tarek's mother
 Joseph Bou Nassar as Riad, Tarek's father
 Liliane Nemri as Nahida (a neighbor)
 Leïla Karam as Brothel Madam (Oum Walid)
 Hassan Farhat as Roadblock Militiaman
 Mahmoud Mabsout as Baker
 Fadi Abou Khalil as Bakery Militiaman

Awards
 Prix François Chalais at the Directors' fortnight of the Cannes Film Festival (1998)
 FIPRESCI International Critics' Award at the Toronto International Film Festival (1998)
 Best First Film at the Carthage Film Festival (1998)
 Youth Jury Award at the Valladolid International Film Festival (1998)
 SAA Script Award at the Fribourg International Film Festival (1999)

See also
 List of submissions to the 71st Academy Awards for Best Foreign Language Film
 List of Lebanese submissions for the Academy Award for Best Foreign Language Film

References

External links
 

1998 films
1990s war drama films
1990s Arabic-language films
Lebanese Civil War films
Films set in 1975
Films scored by Stewart Copeland
Lebanese drama films
1998 drama films
Films directed by Ziad Doueiri